Cloacinidae is a family of nematodes belonging to the order Strongylida.

Genera:
 Labiostrongylus Yorke & Maplestone, 1926

References

Nematode families